Chukhur Mahalla Mosque, also called Shefa Ojagi ( in Azerbaijani), was an Azerbaijani mosque located in Shusha. It was under the occupation of Armenian forces since the capture of Shusha on May 8, 1992, until the city's recapture during the 2020 Nagorno-Karabakh war. 

The mosque was located in the eastern part of Shusha, on N.B. Vazirov Street in the Chukhur Mahalla neighborhood, one of 9 lower neighborhoods of Shusha. Chukhur Mahalla Mosque was one of seventeen mosques in Shusha at the end of the 19th century. The mosque had two minarets. 

Shusha was founded in the 1750s, and Chukur neighborhood was populated even before the construction of the walls of Shusha castle was completed. The nearby Chukhur Gala supplied the neighbourhood with the famous mineral water of Shusha, and the mosque was among the most valuable monuments of the Shusha State Historical and Architectural Reserve.

See also
Yukhari Govhar Agha Mosque
Ashaghi Govhar Agha Mosque
Saatli Mosque
Seyidli Mosque
Khoja Marjanli Mosque
Guyulug Mosque
Taza Mahalla Mosque
Shahbulag Mosque

References

External links

Karabakh Monuments

18th-century mosques
Mosques in Shusha